Countess Klára Andrássy de Csíkszentkirály et Krasznahorka (Kája; 18 January 1898 – 12 April 1941) was a Hungarian noblewoman, who later became a Czechoslovak Communist and revolutionist. She joined Communist Party of Czechoslovakia. She organized sabotages against Nazi road and rail consignments. She was critically wounded, losing both legs, in an Italian air raid over Dubrovnik in 1941, eventually succumbing to her injuries.

Family
Her father was Count Tivadar Andrássy, a politician and painter, eldest son of Prime Minister of Hungary Gyula Andrássy. She had three elder sisters: Ilona, Borbála and Katalin (or Katinka). Klára Andrássy married Prince Károly Odescalchi (1896–1987) on 5 October 1921 but they divorced in 1929.

External links
 Iván Nagy: Magyarország családai czimerekkel és nemzedékrendi táblákkal. I-XIII. Bp., 1857–1868
 

1898 births
1941 deaths
Politicians from Budapest
People from the Kingdom of Hungary
Hungarian nobility
Klara
Communist Party of Czechoslovakia politicians
Hungarian communists
Czech resistance members
Czechoslovak civilians killed in World War II
Hungarian civilians killed in World War II
Deaths by airstrike during World War II
Hungarian amputees